The 2013 Pacific hurricane season was an above-average year in which twenty named storms developed. The hurricane season officially began on May 15 in the East Pacific, coinciding with the formation of Tropical Storm Alvin, and on June 1 in the Central Pacific; it ended on November 30 in both basins. These dates conventionally delimit the period during each year when most tropical cyclones form. The final system of the year, Tropical Storm Sonia, dissipated on November 4.

The season produced twenty-one tropical depressions. All but one further intensified into tropical storms and nine further intensified to become hurricanes. Despite this level of activity, only one hurricane – Raymond – strengthened into a major hurricane. The most significant storm, in terms of loss of life and damage, was Hurricane Manuel. Forming in mid-September, Manuel attained its peak as a minimal Category 1 hurricane before moving ashore on the coastline of Mexico. In total, the storm contributed to 123 confirmed fatalities and $4.2 billion (2013 USD) in damage. Throughout the duration of the season, four other named storms – Hurricane Barbara and tropical storms Juliette, Octave, and Sonia – made landfall in Mexico, causing minor damage and loss of life.

This timeline includes information that was not released in real time, but derived from post-season analyzes by the National Hurricane Center and Central Pacific Hurricane Center; as a result, it may include storms that were not operationally warned upon. This timeline documents tropical cyclone formations, strengthening, weakening, landfalls, extratropical transitions, and dissipations during the season.

Timeline

May
May 15

The 2013 East Pacific hurricane season officially begins.
0600 UTC (11:00 p.m. PDT May 14) – Tropical Depression One-E develops from an area of low pressure about 650 mi (1,045 km) south-southwest of Acapulco, Mexico, becoming the second lowest-latitude-forming tropical cyclone on record.
1800 UTC (11:00 a.m. PDT) – Tropical Depression One-E intensifies into Tropical Storm Alvin roughly 665 mi (1,070 km) south-southwest of Acapulco, Mexico.
May 16
0600 UTC (11:00 p.m.
May 17
0600 UTC (11:00 p.m. PDT May 16) – Tropical Storm Alvin dissipates roughly 775 mi (1,245 km) southwest of Manzanillo, Mexico.
May 28
1200 UTC (5:00 a.m.
1800 UTC (11:00 a.m.
May 29

1200 UTC (5:00 a.m.
1950 UTC (12:50 p.m.
May 30
0000 UTC (5:00 p.m.
0600 UTC (11:00 p.m.
1200 UTC (5:00 a.m.

June
June 1
The 2013 Central Pacific hurricane season officially begins.
June 23
1200 UTC (5:00 a.m.
June 24
0000 UTC (5:00 p.m.
June 25

1200 UTC (5:00 a.m.
June 26
0000 UTC (5:00 p.m.
1800 UTC (11:00 a.m. PDT) – Hurricane Cosme weakens to a tropical storm roughly 465 mi (750 mi) southwest of the southern tip of Baja California.
June 27
1200 UTC (5:00 a.m. PDT) – Tropical Storm Cosme degenerates into a non-convective remnant area of low pressure about 690 mi (1,110 km) west-southwest of Cabo San Lucas, Mexico.
June 29
1800 UTC (11:00 a.m.
June 30
0600 UTC (11:00 p.m.

July
July 2

1200 UTC (5:00 a.m.
1800 UTC (11:00 a.m.
July 3
1800 UTC (11:00 a.m.
July 4
1200 UTC (5:00 a.m.
July 5
0000 UTC (5:00 p.m.
0000 UTC (5:00 p.m.
July 6

0600 UTC (11:00 p.m.
1200 UTC (5:00 a.m.
July 7
0600 UTC (11:00 p.m.
1800 UTC (11:00 a.m.
July 9
0600 UTC (11:00 p.m.
July 25
0000 UTC (5:00 p.m. PDT July 24) – Tropical Depression Six-E develops from an area of low pressure about 980 mi 1,575 km) west-southwest of the southern tip of Baja California.
0600 UTC (11:00 p.m. PDT July 24) – Tropical Depression Six-E intensifies into Tropical Storm Flossie roughly 1,040 mi (1,675 km) southwest of the southern tip of Baja California.
July 27
1200 UTC (5:00 a.m.
~1800 UTC (~11:00 a.m. PDT) – Tropical Storm Flossie crosses 140°W, entering the jurisdiction of the Central Pacific Hurricane Center.

July 30
0000 UTC (5:00 p.m.
1200 UTC (5:00 a.m.
1200 UTC (5:00 a.m. PDT) – Tropical Depression Seven-E develops from an area of low pressure about 1,025 mi (1,650 km) south-southwest of the southern tip of Baja California.
1800 UTC (11:00 a.m. PDT) – Tropical Depression Seven-E intensifies into Tropical Storm Gil roughly 805 mi (1,295 km) southwest of the southern tip of Baja California.
July 31
1800 UTC (11:00 a.m. PDT) – Tropical Storm Gil intensifies into a Category 1 hurricane about 925 mi (1,490 km) southwest of the southern tip of Baja California.

August
August 2

0000 UTC (5:00 p.m.
1800 UTC (11:00 a.m. PDT) – Hurricane Gil weakens to a tropical storm roughly 1,370 mi (2,205 km) west-southwest of the southern tip of Baja California.
August 3
1200 UTC (5:00 a.m. PDT) – Tropical Depression Eight-E develops from an area of low pressure about 1,090 mi (1,755 km) southwest of the southern tip of Baja California.
August 4
0000 UTC (5:00 p.m. PDT August 3) – Tropical Depression Eight-E intensifies into Tropical Storm Henriette roughly 1,180 mi (1,900 km) southwest of the southern tip of Baja California.
1200 UTC (5:00 a.m. PDT) – Tropical Storm Gil weakens to a tropical depression about 1,325 mi (2,130 km) east-southeast of the Hawaiian Islands.
August 6

~0000 UTC (~5:00 p.m. PDT August 5) – Tropical Depression Gil crosses 140°W, entering the jurisdiction of the Central Pacific.
0600 UTC (11:00 p.m. PDT August 5) – Tropical Depression Gil re-intensifies into a tropical storm roughly 1,055 mi (1,700 km) southeast of the Hawaiian Islands.
0600 UTC (11:00 p.m. PDT August 5) – Tropical Storm Henriette intensifies into a Category 1 hurricane about 1,495 mi (2,405 km) west-southwest of the southern tip of Baja California.
1800 UTC (11:00 a.m. PDT) – Tropical Storm Gil weakens to a tropical depression for a second time roughly 985 mi (1,585 km) southeast of the Hawaiian Islands.
August 7
0000 UTC (5:00 p.m. PDT August 6) – Tropical Depression Gil dissipates about 1,065 mi (1,715 km) east-southeast of the Hawaiian Islands.
August 8
1800 UTC (11:00 a.m.
August 9
~0000 UTC (~5:00 p.m. PDT August 8) – Hurricane Henriette crosses 140°W, entering the jurisdiction of the Central Pacific Hurricane Center.
0600 UTC (11:00 p.m. PDT August 8) – Hurricane Henriette weakens to a Category 1 hurricane roughly 945 mi (1,520 km) east-southeast of the Hawaiian Islands.
1200 UTC (5:00 a.m. PDT) – Hurricane Henriette weakens to a tropical storm about 885 mi (1,425 km) southeast of the Hawaiian Islands.
August 11
1200 UTC (5:00 a.m.
1800 UTC (11:00 a.m.
August 16
1500 UTC (5:00 a.m. HST) – Tropical Storm Pewa develops from an area of low pressure roughly 1,240 mi (1,995 km) southwest of Lihue, Hawaii.

August 18
~0600 UTC (~8:00 p.m. HST August 17) – Tropical Storm Pewa crosses the International Date Line and moves into the West Pacific.
August 19
0300 UTC (5:00 p.m. HST August 18) – Tropical Storm Unala develops from an area of low pressure about 1,360 mi (2,190 km) west of Honolulu, Hawaii.
~0900 UTC (~11:00 p.m. HST August 18) – Tropical Storm Unala crosses the International Date Line and moves into the West Pacific. 
2100 UTC (11:00 a.m. HST) – Tropical Depression Three-C develops from an area of low pressure roughly 1,075 mi (1,730 km) west of Lihue, Hawaii.
August 20
~1500 UTC (~5:00 a.m. HST) – Tropical Depression Three-C crosses the International Date Line and moves into the West Pacific basin. 
August 22
1200 UTC (5:00 a.m.
August 23

0000 UTC (5:00 p.m.
August 24
0000 UTC (5:00 p.m.
August 25
0000 UTC (5:00 p.m.
1800 UTC (11:00 a.m.
August 28
1200 UTC (5:00 a.m.
August 29
0600 UTC (11:00 p.m.
0900 UTC (2:00 a.m.
August 30

0000 UTC (5:00 p.m.
1200 UTC (5:00 a.m.
August 31
1200 UTC (5:00 a.m.

September
September 1
0600 UTC (11:00 p.m.
1800 UTC (11:00 a.m.
September 2
1200 UTC (5:00 a.m.
September 5
0600 UTC (11:00 p.m.
1200 UTC (5:00 a.m.
September 6

1200 UTC (5:00 a.m.
September 7
1200 UTC (5:00 a.m.
1800 UTC (11:00 a.m.
September 13
1200 UTC (5:00 a.m.
1800 UTC (11:00 a.m.
September 15
1200 UTC (5:00 a.m.
September 16
0000 UTC (5:00 p.m.
0600 UTC (11:00 p.m.
September 17
1800 UTC (11:00 a.m.
September 18
0600 UTC (11:00 p.m.

September 19
0000 UTC (5:00 p.m.
0600 UTC (11:00 p.m.
1200 UTC (5:00 a.m.
1800 UTC (11:00 a.m.
September 20
0000 UTC (5:00 p.m. PDT September 19) – Tropical Storm Manuel dissipates over the Sierra Madre Occidental.

October
October 6

1800 UTC (11:00 a.m. PDT) – Tropical Depression Fourteen-E develops from an area of low pressure about 865 mi (1,390 km) southwest of the southern tip of Baja California.
October 7
0000 UTC (5:00 .m. PDT October 6) – Tropical Depression Fourteen-E intensifies into Tropical Storm Narda roughly 915 mi (1,475 km) southwest of the southern tip of Baja California.
1800 UTC (11:00 a.m.
October 9
0000 UTC (5:00 p.m. PDT October 8) – Tropical Storm Narda weakens to a tropical depression about 1,245 mi (2,005 km) west-southwest of the southern tip of Baja California.
October 10
1200 UTC (5:00 a.m. PDT) – Tropical Depression Narda degenerates into a non-convective remnant area of low pressure roughly 1,320 mi (2,125 km) west-southwest of the southern tip of Baja California.
October 12
1800 UTC (11:00 a.m.
October 13

0000 UTC (5:00 p.m.
1800 UTC (11:00 a.m.
October 14
0000 UTC (5:00 p.m. PDT October 13) – Tropical Depression Sixteen-E develops from an area of low pressure about 810 mi (1,305 km) south-southwest of the southern tip of Baja California.
0600 UTC (11:00 p.m. PDT October 13) – Tropical Depression Sixteen-E intensifies into Tropical Storm Priscilla roughly 740 mi (1,190 km) southwest of the southern tip of Baja California.
1200 UTC (5:00 a.m.

October 15
0500 UTC (10:00 p.m.
1200 UTC (5:00 a.m.
1800 UTC (11:00 a.m.
1800 UTC (11:00 a.m.
October 16
1800 UTC (11:00 a.m. PDT) – Tropical Depression Priscilla degenerates into a non-convective remnant area of low pressure roughly 720 mi (1,160 km) west-southwest of the southern tip of Baja California.
October 20
0000 UTC (5:00 p.m.
0600 UTC (11:00 p.m.
October 21
0000 UTC (5:00 p.m.
0600 UTC (11:00 p.m.
1200 UTC (5:00 a.m.
1800 UTC (11:00 a.m.

October 22
0600 UTC (11:00 p.m.
1800 UTC (11:00 a.m.
October 23
0600 UTC (11:00 p.m.
October 27
1200 UTC (5:00 a.m. PDT) – Tropical Storm Raymond re-intensifies into a Category 1 hurricane about 730 mi (1,175 km) south-southwest of the southern tip of Baja California.
October 28
0000 UTC (5:00 p.m. PDT October 27) – Hurricane Raymond re-intensifies into a Category 2 hurricane roughly 715 mi (1,150 km) southwest of the southern tip of Baja California.
1200 UTC (5:00 a.m. PDT) – Hurricane Raymond weakens to a Category 1 hurricane for a second time about 660 mi (1,060 km) southwest of the southern tip of Baja California.
October 29
0000 UTC (5:00 p.m. PDT October 28) – Hurricane Raymond weakens to a tropical storm for a second time roughly 620 mi (1,000 km) southwest of the southern tip of Baja California.
October 30
0600 UTC (11:00 p.m.
1200 UTC (5:00 a.m.

November
November 1

0600 UTC (11:00 p.m.
November 3
0000 UTC (4:00 p.m.
1800 UTC (10:00 a.m.
November 4
0500 UTC (9:00 p.m.
0600 UTC (10:00 p.m.
1200 UTC (4:00 a.m. PST) – Tropical Depression Sonia dissipates over the Sierra Madre Occidental.
November 30
The 2013 Pacific hurricane season officially ends.

See also
 List of Pacific hurricanes
 Timeline of the 2013 Atlantic hurricane season

Footnotes

References

External links

 The NHC's 2013 Tropical Cyclone Advisory Archive

2013 Pacific hurricane season
Articles which contain graphical timelines
2013 EPac T